UACRR (Ukrainian Agency of Copyright and Related Rights) is a collective rights management organization in Ukraine. UACRR administers public performance rights, mechanical recording and reproduction rights, and dramatic rights.

External links
Official site
Official site (english)

Business organizations based in Ukraine
Music licensing organizations
Copyright collection societies